The Toba Kakar or Toba Kakari are a southern offshoot of the Sulaiman Mountains in the Balochistan province of Pakistan, extending into the Kandahar and Zabul provinces of Afghanistan. The historical route through the mountains is known as the Bolan Pass. The mountains originally received media attention in August 1979; when evidence emerged that Pakistan may be using them as a potential workspace towards development of nuclear weapons. It was an occasional hideout for the Taliban during the Afghanistan conflict.

A western offshoot of the range in Killa Abdullah, Balochistan and Maruf District, Afghanistan is called the Toba Achakzai, where Ahmad Shah Durrani, the founder of Afghanistan, used to pass some of the hot weeks in summer during the last few years of his life.

See also

 Mountain ranges of Pakistan

References

Mountain ranges of the Himalayas
Mountain ranges of Balochistan (Pakistan)
Landforms of Kandahar Province
Landforms of Zabul Province